"Different" is a song by English singer-songwriter Robbie Williams, taken from his ninth studio album, Take the Crown. It was released as the album's second single on 17 December 2012. The song was written by Williams, Gary Barlow and Jacknife Lee. The single was accompanied by four extra tracks: "On My Own", a duet with Tom Jones, "Soul Transmission", "White Man in Hanoi", a cut from Take the Crown, and "The Promise", a cover from singer songwriter Paul Freeman (Robbie's Christmas song).

Background
"Different" was produced by Jacknife Lee, who said of the track: "I think when Robbie gets a song right, it's the vulnerability mixed with the bravado that makes it so compelling", to which Robbie replied, "It's the great hope of the second single variety. A lot of effort went into this song, which is a very personal statement". Williams also commented on the number of B-sides released with the single: "I write so many songs and I love all of them, but they don't all make it onto a record. Some of my favourite songs have never been heard. I wanted to put out an EP so a few more could be heard. Check out the legend that is Tom Jones on 'On My Own'. 'The Promise' is my Christmas song." Digital versions of the single available in Germany contain a bonus live recording of "Different", featuring vocals from co-songwriter Gary Barlow, who performed the track live with Williams on 23 November 2012, at the O2 Arena in London.

Music video
The music video for the track premiered on 27 November 2012, via Williams' official VEVO account on YouTube, at a total length of five minutes and seven seconds. Directed by W.I.Z., the video features Williams dressed as an orchestra conductor, who is conducting an orchestra playing music for a film that also features Williams as the lead role, a gangster character struggling to prevent his strained relationship with wife boiling over and affecting his job. He is seen arguing with his wife, wasting a pint of milk she had especially bought for him. Williams said of the video: "It was a real fun one to film. It took around three days to film each of the separate sequences, but the supporting cast were exceptionally great. I would love to make videos like this all the time."

Track listing

Charts

Release history

References

2012 singles
2012 songs
Robbie Williams songs
Songs written by Robbie Williams
Songs written by Gary Barlow
Song recordings produced by Jacknife Lee
Island Records singles
Songs written by Jacknife Lee